Foley Square is an American sitcom starring Margaret Colin which centers on an assistant district attorney in New York City. Original episodes aired from December 11, 1985 until April 8, 1986.

Cast
Margaret Colin as Alex Harrigan
Héctor Elizondo as Jesse Steinberg
Vernee Watson-Johnson as Denise Willums
Michael Lembeck as Peter Newman
Cathy Silvers as Molly Dobbs
Sanford Jensen as Carter DeVries
Israel Juarbe as Angel Gomez
Jon Lovitz as Mole
Richard C. Sarafian as Spiro Papadopolis

Synopsis

Alex Harrigan is a perky, dedicated, unmarried assistant district attorney who works in a District Attorney's office located in New York City on Foley Square in Manhattan. Her boss, District Attorney Jesse Steinberg, is a veteran prosecutor who has seen it all and who she feels overlooks her when assigning the offices important cases to its staff of prosecutors. She also works with Assistant District Attorney Carter DeVries, who is overbearing and ambitious, and young Assistant District Attorney Molly Dobbs, who has just graduated from law school. Alex's secretary is Denise Willums, and the office's messenger is Angel Gomez, a young ex-convict. Mole is the office's investigator. When on break and after work, the co-workers gather across the street from the office at a coffee shop owned and operated by Spiro Papadopolis.

Alex lives in an apartment building on Manhattan's Upper West Side. Peter Newman, a schoolteacher, is her neighbor in the building and a good friend. Alex's social life is prone to ups and downs.

Production

Creator and producer Diane English intended Foley Square and its scripts to reflect what she considered to be the "womens viewpoint."

Cast members Cathy Silvers and Michael Lembeck held the unusual distinction of being the second generation of their respective families to appear together in a television show: Their fathers, Phil Silvers and Harvey Lembeck, had acted together in The Phil Silvers Show from 1955 to 1959.

Writers involved in Foley Square were Dennis Danziger, Diane English, Karyl Geld Miller, Bernie Orenstein, Ellen Sandler, Korby Siamis, and Saul Turteltaub. Episode directors were Peter Baldwin, Peter Bonerz, and Ellen Gittelsohn.

Broadcast history and cancellation

Foley Square aired on Wednesdays at 8:30 p.m., paired with Mary Tyler Moores sitcom Mary at 8:00 p.m.  Both shows premiered on December 11, 1985, and languished near the bottom of the Nielsen ratings in the weeks that followed. After the tenth episode of Mary was broadcast on February 19, 1986, Mary went into hiatus, as did Foley Square after its eleventh episode aired a week later on February 26, 1986. CBS rescheduled them to appear on Tuesdays, with Mary at 9:00 p.m. and Foley Square at 9:30 p.m., hoping that this would improve their ratings, and telecasts of the two shows resumed on March 25, 1986. Despite the change of day and time, ratings remained low, and both shows were cancelled after only three-episode runs in their new time slots, with Foley Squares fourteenth and last episode airing on April 8, 1986, right after Mary'''s thirteenth and last episode.

During the summer of 1986, CBS aired prime-time reruns of Foley Square'' at 8:00 p.m. on Wednesdays from June 11 to July 23.

Episodes

References

External links

Opening credits of Foley Square on Youtube

CBS original programming
1985 American television series debuts
1986 American television series endings
1980s American sitcoms
1980s American legal television series
1980s American workplace comedy television series
English-language television shows
Television shows set in New York City
Television series created by Diane English